Grey energy may refer to:
 Energy produced from fossil fuels, a usage appearing in conjunction with the Regulating Energy Tax in the Netherlands
 Embodied energy, the total energy used to make something
 The term "grey energy" (or "gray energy") refers to energy produced from polluting sources as a contrast to green energy from renewable, non-polluting sources.